Krisztián Takács (born 30 December 1985 in Budapest) is a Hungarian swimmer, Olympic participant and the current national record holder on 50 metre freestyle.

Takács set the new Hungarian record on 50m freestyle at the 2009 World Aquatics Championships in Rome. First, he broke the former national record, also held by him, during the semi-final heats with a time of 21.65, finishing tied eight with George Bovell of Trinidad and Tobago. At the end of the day the two sprinters faced again to decide the last remaining place in the final. Bovell won the swim-off with a new championship record time of 21.20 and thus qualified for the final, however, Takács also shaved off further two tenths from his time to improve the national record to 21.42.

References

External links
 

1985 births
Living people
Swimmers from Budapest
Hungarian male swimmers
Hungarian male freestyle swimmers
Male butterfly swimmers
Olympic swimmers of Hungary
Swimmers at the 2004 Summer Olympics
Swimmers at the 2008 Summer Olympics
Swimmers at the 2012 Summer Olympics
Swimmers at the 2016 Summer Olympics
20th-century Hungarian people
21st-century Hungarian people
Competitors at the 2022 World Games
World Games gold medalists